Leopoldo Faretra (Grottaminarda, 1 February 1908 – Passo Eclano, 25 May 2001) was an Italian physician. He devoted his life to those in need of care and was strongly opposed to his political ideals. From 2 November 1943 to 13 April 1945 directed the Infirmary in Italian concentration camp in Hemer, in the northwest of Germany, in which he worked a resistance unarmed, allowing them to escape the German heavy work in the hundreds of Italians. On 3 September 1944, Faretra was reported to the Gestapo for propagating anti-German propaganda and to have caused the failure of the request for voluntary cooperation by the Germans advanced to the Italian military infirmary run by him. After his death, 16 March 2010 he was awarded the Medal of Honor due to him as an Italian citizen deported to a concentration camp Nazi.

Life
Leopoldo Faretra was born in Grottaminarda. He devoted his life to poor and needy people and he fought against infant mortality.

From 2 November 1943 to 13 April 1945, he directed Italian infirmary in the concentration camp of Hemer, in the north-west of Germany. Here, he prescribed a lot of false medical certificates to deported people in order to get them away from death caused by work in heavy industry.

He worked as health officer in Rocchetta Sant'Antonio. Then he moved to Venezuela cause of his socialist ideals and because there were needed doctors. There, doctor Faretra was the only one who gave immediately help to survivors of an air accident through impassable paths risking his life.

In 1957 he specialized in gynaecology and he managed to save a lot of unborn children and women in childbed through surgical operations. On 16 May 2010 it was award him a medal of honour because he was an Italian deported in a Nazi lager.

Bibliography

Notes

External links
 Some places and memories related to Leopoldo Faretra

Italian gynaecologists
1908 births
2001 deaths